Here and There may refer to:

 Here and There (Elton John album), 1976
 Here and There (Eric Dolphy album), 1961
 Here & There – S.E.S. Singles Collection, 2001
 Here and There (TV series), a Canadian documentary television series
 Here and There (film), a 2009 Serbian film
 Aquí y allá, also known as Here and There, a 2012 drama film

See also
There and Here, a 2001 album by Spock's Beard